Peter Quallo (born 2 October 1971) is a German former professional footballer who played as a defender.

References

1971 births
Living people
Association football defenders
German footballers
Germany under-21 international footballers
Borussia Dortmund players
Fortuna Düsseldorf players
Arminia Bielefeld players
Rot-Weiß Oberhausen players
SV Wilhelmshaven players
VfB Oldenburg players
Bundesliga players
2. Bundesliga players